Qingzhoushi railway station is a railway station in Qingzhou, a county-level city administered by Weifang City, Shandong. It is on the Qingdao-Jinan Passenger Railway.

Service 
All classes of trains stop at Qingzhou, from the slowest "general" trains (denoted without a letter) to the fastest high-speed trains (denoted with a "G" in front of the number).  Currently, six general trains stop at the station, offering service to Qingdao, Yantai, Shijiazhuang in Hebei province, Zhengzhou in Henan province, and Wuhan in Hubei province.  The "general-fast" trains (denoted with a letter "K") offer service to these cities and others throughout China, such as Xuzhou and Chengdu.

As this station is on the Qingdao-Jinan Passenger Railway, many high-speed trains also stop at this station. These trains offer service to Qingdao, Jinan, Tianjin, and Beijing. Some of high-speed CRH trains("G" trains) also stop here. Two of these trains go towards Shanghai Hongqiao railway station while the other two go to Qingdao railway station.

References 

Railway stations in Shandong
Railway stations in China opened in 2008
Stations on the Qingdao–Taiyuan High-Speed Railway
Stations on the Qingdao–Jinan passenger railway